Thomas Riley (March 1882 – November 1942) was an English professional football full back who played in the Football League for Blackburn Rovers and Aston Villa.

Career statistics

References

External links
Aston Villa career details

1882 births
Footballers from Blackburn
1942 deaths
English footballers
English Football League players
Association football fullbacks
Southern Football League players
Aston Villa F.C. players
Blackburn Rovers F.C. players
Brentford F.C. players
Chorley F.C. players
Southampton F.C. players